The 1905 Georgia Tech Yellow Jackets football team represented the Georgia Institute of Technology during the 1905 Southern Intercollegiate Athletic Association football season. This is the second year for Georgia Tech under coach John Heisman.

Schedule

References

Georgia Tech
Georgia Tech Yellow Jackets football seasons
Georgia Tech Yellow Jackets football